Saint Francis High School (SFHS) is a high school located in St. Francis, Minnesota, United States. It is part of ISD 15 and covers about 165 square miles. Independent School District 15 includes the cities of St. Francis, Bethel, East Bethel, Oak Grove, portions of Andover and Nowthen, as well as portions of Athens and Stanford townships. The district is supported by a population of over 26,000 and annually educates about 6,000 people.  There are three elementary schools (K5) and one middle school (68) that send students to the high school.

Academic departments

Saint Francis High School currently supports 13 different academic departments, art, business, counseling, FACS, industrial technology, language arts, math, music, physical education, science, social studies, special education, and world languages (Spanish and German).

Activities
Students attending Saint Francis High School have the opportunity to participate in numerous activities through the Mississippi 8 Conference and the Minnesota State High School League. Student Council, National Honor Society, band, (Honors wind ensemble, honor band) choir, show choir (Bridge Street Singers)(Prima Voce), debate, speech, one-act play and Knowledge Bowl are such activities.  The high school also offers club activities, such as HOSA, DECA, a student newspaper (The Crier), yearbook (The Lance), SkillsUSA, drama, and art.   Along with the students actively involved in the food shelf that is hosted there.

Athletics

There are many different sports offered at Saint Francis High School for both boys and girls, at the varsity and junior varsity levels.  In the fall, cross country, football and soccer are offered for boys, while volleyball, tennis, soccer and cross country are offered for girls sports.  In the winter, girls sports include basketball, dance team, gymnastics, and hockey.  Winter boys' sports include basketball, hockey, and wrestling.  Boys sports offered in the spring are golf, baseball, track and field, and tennis.  In the spring, girls have the opportunity to participate in softball, golf and track and field. The high school was previously a part of the North Suburban Conference, however, transitioned into the Mississippi 8 Conference in 2013.

References

Schools in Anoka County, Minnesota
Educational institutions in the United States with year of establishment missing
Public high schools in Minnesota